Passion, Pain & Pleasure (stylized as PASSION PAIN & PLEASURE) is the fourth studio album by American R&B recording artist Trey Songz; it was released on September 14, 2010. The album serves as a follow-up to his commercial breakthrough Ready (2009). Production for the album took place from March 2010 to July 2010 and was handled by several record producers, including his mentor Troy Taylor, Bryan-Michael Cox, Stargate and Mario Winans, among others.

The album debuted at number 2 on the US Billboard 200, selling 240,000 copies in its first week. It has produced two singles, including "Can't Be Friends" and Billboard hit "Bottoms Up". The album was certified platinum by the Recording Industry Association of America (RIAA), for combined sales and streaming equivalent units of over a million units. Upon its release, Passion, Pain & Pleasure received positive reviews from most music critics. Songz promoted the album via his Summer 2010 tour with R&B singer Monica.

Singles
The album's lead single "Bottoms Up" featuring Nicki Minaj, was released on July 27, 2010. The music video was filmed on July 31, 2010 and was released Tuesday, August 17, 2010 on BET. It has reached at number 2 on the US Billboard Hot R&B/Hip-Hop Songs and at number 6 on the Billboard Hot 100 chart.

The album's second single "Can't Be Friends" was released on September 28, 2010. The song produced by Mario Winans and it contains a sample of composer Ryuichi Sakamoto's "Bibo no Aozora" from the score of 2006 drama film Babel. It charted at number 1 on the Billboard Hot R&B/Hip-Hop Songs and at number 43 on the Billboard Hot 100. The music video was filmed and was released on September 7, 2010.

"Love Faces"  and "Unusual"  featuring  Drake were released as the third and fourth singles respectively.

Leaks
In August 2010, the tracks "Love Faces" and "Doorbell" leaked through the internet. On his Ustream.tv channel, Songz expressed his feelings regarding the leaks, stating "Shout out to everybody who didn't listen to the leaks. Bootleggers gotta eat. I ain't mad at y'all boys". In his response, Songz also premiered the track "Massage", a boudior-oriented slow jam about giving a lover a head-to-toe massage that he performs on tour with giving a selected audience member a massage onstage.

Critical reception

Passion, Pain & Pleasure received positive reviews from most music critics. At Metacritic, which assigns a normalized rating out of 100 to reviews from mainstream critics, the album received an average score of 71, based on five reviews, which indicates "generally favorable reviews". Allmusic writer Andy Kellman gave it four out of five stars and complimented its second half as "the strongest, most varied side of a Trey Songz album, just about flawless. It smoothly shifts through several moods". BBC Online's Mike Diver praised the album's "in-depth descriptions of how our protagonist is going to pleasure his other half" and noted Songz's performance as a strength, stating "The skill is in the execution, in the articulation – and Trey is well studied and blessed with some wonderfully smooth vocals". Sean Fennessey of The Washington Post wrote that the album "is softer and subtler than Ready. There are more ballads here -- and fewer 'panty-droppers' and 'baby-makers'. Instead, Trey is making 'Love Faces' at his girl, or growing reflective, and occasionally maudlin, as on 'Can't Be Friends'". Tyler Lewis of PopMatters commented that "Songz rides the tonal and rhythmic shifts with impressive agility" and commended "a clearly rejuvenated songwriting team of Troy Taylor, Edrick Miles, Tony Scales, and Songz himself, who in various combinations wrote the lyrics and melodies to nearly every song here".

In contrast, Rolling Stone writer Will Hermes gave the album two out of five stars and stated "it's just steady mackin' over dull, airbrushed slow-jams". Andrew Murfett of The Sydney Morning Herald expressed a negative response towards its sexual content and stated "Little, if anything, is left to the imagination here". Los Angeles Times writer August Brown viewed that Songz "lacks an especially charismatic voice", but complimented its musical quality and wrote that the album "leaves you like a perfect one night stand — you don’t have to remember the person, just the way he or she made you feel". About.com's Mark Edward Nero stated "this album's musical and vocal quality are consistently good from track to track" and concluded "despite the few miscues, this is clearly Trey's most consistent album yet". USA Todays Steve Jones gave the album three out of four stars and stated "his consistent passion makes listening a pleasure".

Commercial performance
The album debuted at number 2 on the US Billboard 200 chart, with first-week sales of 240,000 copies. In its second week, it dropped to number 7 on the chart and sold 66,000 copies. The album remained at number 7 and sold 42,000 copies in its third week. It fell two spots to number 9 on the chart and sold 32,000 copies in its fourth week. The album has currently sold 823,000 copies in the United States. The album was certified platinum by the Recording Industry Association of America (RIAA), for combined sales and streaming equivalent units of over a million units. Passion, Pain & Pleasure debuted at number 32 on Canada's Top 100 Albums chart.

Track listing

Notes
 "Can't Be Friends" contains samples of "Bibo No Aozora" performed by Ryuichi Sakamoto.
 "Doorbell" contains elements of "Carol of the Bells", written by Mykola Leontovych and P. Wilhousky.

Personnel
Credits for Passion, Pain & Pleasure adapted from Allmusic.<ref>[ Credits: Passion, Pain & Pleasure]. Allmusic. Retrieved on 2010-09-15.</ref>

 Rebecca Alexis – stylist
 Johnta Austin – background vocals, executive producer
 Tanisha Broadwater – production coordination
 Dee Brown – engineer
 Greg Gigendad Burke – art direction, design
 Mike Caren – A&R
 Charles Parker, Jr. – violin
 Mark B. Christensen – mastering
 Andrew Clifton – producer
 Nina Cottman – violin
 Carl Cox, Jr. – flute, tenor saxophone
 Steve Dickey "Rock Star" – engineer
 Wayne Washington  – A&R
 Jesus Garnica – assistant
 Sasha Gomez – vocals
 Dionnee Harper – marketing
 Jean-Marie Horvat – vocals, mixing
 Eric Hudson – producer, instrumentation
 J-MIKE – producer
 Mark "the Mogul" Jackson – producer
 Jaycen Joshua – mixing
 Kane Beatz – producer
 Olga Konopelsky – violin
 Emma Kummrow – violin
 Christian Lantry – photography
 Ezekiel Lewis – vocal producer
 Giancarlo Lino – assistant
 Bei Maejor – producer

 Connie Makita – design
 Fabian Marasciullo – mixing
 John McGee – producer, musician
 Donnie Meadows – production coordination
 Edrick Miles – background vocals, lyricist, producer, musician
 Frank Nitty – background vocals
 Adrian "A.J." Nunez – assistant
 Thiago Pinto – engineer
 Zachariah Redding – assistant
 Karen Anna Schubert – French horn
 Noah Shebib – producer
 Stan Slotter – trumpet
 Jerren "J-Kits" Spruill – producer, engineer
 Zach Steele – engineer
 Romeo Taylor – producer, engineer
 Troy Taylor – background vocals, producer, engineer, executive producer, vocal producer, musician
 Gregory Teperman – violin
 Tha Bizness – producer
 Stephen Tirpak – trombone
 Chef Tone – lyricist
 Carolyn Tracey – package production
 The Track Dealer – producer
 Allison Traylor – guitar
 Trey Songz – background vocals, lyricist, engineer, executive producer, vocal producer
 John Walsh – trumpet
 Dexter Wansel – producer
 Mark Ward – cello
 Mario Winans – producer

Charts

Weekly charts

Year-end charts

Certifications

Release history

References

External links
 
 Passion, Pain & Pleasure'' at Metacritic

2010 albums
Albums produced by Eric Hudson
Albums produced by Kane Beatz
Albums produced by Noah "40" Shebib
Albums produced by Polow da Don
Albums produced by Stargate
Albums produced by Swizz Beatz
Albums produced by Tha Bizness
Albums produced by Troy Taylor (record producer)
Atlantic Records albums
Trey Songz albums
Albums produced by Maejor
Albums produced by FKi (production team)
Albums produced by Oak Felder